The Assistant Secretary of State for Population, Refugees, and Migration is the head of the Bureau of Population, Refugees, and Migration within the United States Department of State.  The Assistant Secretary of State for Population, Refugees, and Migration reports to the Under Secretary of State for Civilian Security, Democracy, and Human Rights.

List of the Directors of the Bureau of Refugee Programs, 1979—1994

List of the Assistant Secretaries of State for Population, Refugees, and Migration, 1994—Present 

Note: officials named in italics served in an acting capacity.

External links
List of Assistant Secretaries of State for Population, Refugees, and Migration at the State Department website
Website of the Bureau of Population, Refugees, and Migration

References